This is a compilation of the results of the teams representing Austria at official international women's football competitions, that is the UEFA Women's Cup and its successor, the UEFA Women's Champions League.

As of the 2016–17 edition, Austria is ranked 9th in the UWCL's association standings, and it is thus one of twelve associations currently granted two spots in the competition. It has appeared in the quarterfinals once, through Neulengbach in the 2013–14 edition.

Teams
These are the five teams that have represented Austria in the UEFA Women's Cup and the UEFA Women's Champions League.

Progression by season

1 Group stage. Highest-ranked eliminated team in case of qualification, lowest-ranked qualified team in case of elimination.

Results by team

Innsbruck

Landhaus

Neulengbach

St. Pölten-Spratzern

Sturm Graz

References

Women's football clubs in international competitions
Women